Ankyrin repeat domain 22 is a protein that in humans is encoded by the ANKRD22 gene.

References

Further reading